Orosomucoid (ORM) or alpha-1-acid glycoprotein (α1AGp, AGP or AAG) is an acute phase protein found in plasma.  It is an alpha-globulin glycoprotein and is modulated by two polymorphic genes. It is synthesized primarily in hepatocytes and has a normal plasma concentration between 0.6–1.2 mg/mL (1–3% plasma protein). Plasma levels are affected by pregnancy, burns, certain drugs, and certain diseases, particularly HIV.

The only established function of ORM is to act as a carrier of basic and neutrally charged lipophilic compounds. In medicine, it is known as the primary carrier of basic (positively charged) drugs (whereas albumin carries acidic (negatively charged) and neutral drugs), steroids, and protease inhibitors. Aging causes a small decrease in plasma albumin levels; if anything, there is a small increase in alpha-1-acid glycoprotein. The effect of these changes on drug protein binding and drug delivery, however, appear to be minimal. AGP shows a complex interaction with thyroid homeostasis: AGP in low concentrations was observed to stimulate the thyrotropin (TSH) receptor and intracellular accumulation of cyclic AMP. High AGP concentrations, however, inhibited TSH signalling.

Alpha-1-acid glycoprotein has been identified as one of four potentially useful circulating biomarkers for estimating the five-year risk of all-cause mortality (the other three are albumin, very low-density lipoprotein particle size, and citrate).

Orosomucoid increases in amount in obstructive jaundices while diminishes in hepatocellular jaundice and in intestinal infections.

References

External links 
 

Acute-phase proteins
Glycoproteins
Molecular biology
Proteomics